Wood Green Academy is a coeducational secondary school and sixth form with academy status located in Wednesbury, West Midlands, England. In 2009, Ofsted listed Wood Green as one of 12 outstanding schools serving disadvantaged communities.

Admissions
The head teacher is James Topham, who started the role in September 2014, taking over from Pank Patel. Pank succeeded the retiring Enid Bibby, who had been head teacher for eight years and became a dame in 2004 following a significant increase in academic results at the school during her tenure.

The school is situated on the A461 Wood Green Road which connects Wednesbury with Walsall.

History

Grammar school
The school was originally named Wednesbury Boys' High School. It was a grammar school that opened in Wood Green House, St. Paul's Road in 1924 under the headship of C. H. S. Kipping. The school was sometimes also referred to as Wednesbury Grammar School. The school's motto was Arte Marte Vigore, which was also the motto of the Borough of Wednesbury. Former members of the school are known as "Old Wodens" and The Old Wodens Society still meets bi-annually.

Comprehensive
The buildings were expanded during the 1950s, and by 1970 the school had been converted to a comprehensive school.

In 1968, it merged with Wood Green Secondary Modern School to become Wood Green Bilateral School. The Wednesbury Girls' High School, a girls' grammar school, merged into the sixth form. It became Wood Green High School in September 1969, serving pupils of both sexes.

The school includes a sixth form for pupils aged over 16.

Academic performance
In 2013, 68% of students achieved 5 or more GCSEs at grades A*-C, including Maths and English. 100% of students passed their A-levels.

Alumni

Wednesbury Boys' High School
 John Morgan CBE, Managing Director from 1965-8 of  English Electric-AEI Machines Group, Chairman from 1984-8 of AMEC 
 Sir Kevin Satchwell

References

External links
 Former school
 EduBase

Academies in Sandwell
Educational institutions established in 1924
Wednesbury
Secondary schools in Sandwell
1924 establishments in England